Ryazanovo is a rural locality (a village) in Nikolskoye Rural Settlement, Ust-Kubinsky District, Vologda Oblast, Russia. The population was 2 as of 2002.

Geography 
Ryazanovo is located 37 km northwest of Ustye (the district's administrative centre) by road. Nikolskoye is the nearest rural locality.

References 

Rural localities in Ust-Kubinsky District